Eva Carolina Quattrocci (born April 21, 1995), better known as Eva De Dominici, is an Argentine model and actress. She was born in Avellaneda, Buenos Aires, Argentina.

Career 
She began her acting career in 2005, after being a model. She is known for her villainous role in Los ricos no piden permiso.

Personal life 
In her interview on a TV show, she said she had an accident in her childhood which damaged her teeth, and she was bullied for her separated teeth by her classmates. She lives with her parents. In March 2016, she began a relationship with the actor Joaquín Furriel, from whom she separated in 2018. In 2018 she began a relationship with Eduardo Cruz, brother of Spanish actress Penélope Cruz. On October 6, 2019, they became parents for the first time of a boy whom they named Cairo Cruz in Los Angeles, California.

Filmography

Television

Movies

Theater

Awards

References

External links 

1995 births
Argentine actresses
Argentine female models
Living people
21st-century Argentine women